The Battle of Lopera took place between 27 and 29 December 1936 during the Spanish Civil War. This battle took place during the Nationalist's Aceituna offensive. On 27 December, the XIV International Brigade launched an attack in order to occupy the Nationalist-held town of Lopera, but the attack failed after two days and the Brigade suffered appalling casualties.

Background
In December 1936, Queipo de Llano started an offensive in order to capture the olive-growing area of Andújar, province of Jaén. The Republic then sent the recently formed XIV International Brigade to the Andújar front, in order to retake the town of Lopera occupied by the Nationalists on 24 December.

The battle
On 27 December, the Brigade launched an attack in order to recover the town of Lopera. The XIV International Brigade (3,000 men), led by General Walter, had no training or telephone communications. Furthermore, they did not have air or artillery support. On this front the Nationalists had Commander Redondo's column with a shock brigade of Andalusian requetes (2,000 men) and 2,000 Moroccan regulares and Spanish cavalry. The brigade members were decimated by the Nationalists with machine gun fire, mortars and artillery. After 36 hours the attack was called off.

Aftermath
The Brigade had lost 800 men (300 dead), among them the English poets, John Cornford and Ralph Winston Fox. The English company of the 10th battalion lost 78 men out of 145. After the battle, André Marty ordered the detention of the commander of the French battalion of the Brigade, Gaston Delasalle. Delasalle was accused of incompetence, cowardice and of being a fascist spy, and executed by firing squad.

See also 

 List of Spanish Republican military equipment of the Spanish Civil War
 List of Spanish Nationalist military equipment of the Spanish Civil War

References

Bibliography
Beevor, Antony. (2006). The battle for Spain. The Spanish Civil war, 1936–1939. Penguin Books. London. .
Thomas, Hugh. (2001). The Spanish Civil War. Penguin Books. London. .

External links
Battle of Lopera

Lopera
Lopera
1936 in Spain
Lopera
Province of Jaén (Spain)
December 1936 events